Gravellona Toce is a comune (municipality) in the Province of Verbano-Cusio-Ossola in the Italian region Piedmont, located about  northeast of Turin and about  west of Verbania.

Main sights
Gallo-Roman necropolis
Parish church of St. Peter (12th century)
Romanesque church of St. Maurice (10th century)

References

Cities and towns in Piedmont